Kārlis Ozols-Priednieks (aka Karl Ozol-Prednek, 3 March 1896, Līvbērze–7 July 1943) was a Latvian poet active in Proletkult.

He held a prominent position both in the Proletkult organisation in Petrograd, as well as in the national organisation. In 1918 he advocated that Proletkult membership should be restricted to members of the Russian Communist Party.

He was executed by the Soviet state on 2 February 1938.

References

1896 births
1938 deaths
People from Jelgava Municipality
People from Courland Governorate
20th-century Latvian poets
Latvian male poets
Great Purge victims from Latvia